Boris Silchev (born 7 February 1926) was a Soviet boxer. He competed in the men's middleweight event at the 1952 Summer Olympics. At the 1952 Summer Olympics, he lost to Anthony Madigan of Australia.

References

External links
 

1926 births
Possibly living people
Soviet male boxers
Olympic boxers of the Soviet Union
Boxers at the 1952 Summer Olympics
Place of birth missing
Middleweight boxers